Daryacheh (meaning "lake") may refer to:
 Daryacheh, Kerman
 Daryacheh, Kermanshah
 Daryacheh, Razavi Khorasan